Viliami Ma'afu (born 9 March 1982) is a Tongan rugby union footballer. His usual position is number eight. He was part of the Tongan squad at the 2011 Rugby World Cup where he played in four matches.
In Summer 2012, he joined Glasgow Warriors from Japanese side Mitsubishi Sagamihara DynaBoars but left again in September 2012  due to family and personal reasons.

References

External links 

Glasgow Warriors Profile

1982 births
Living people
Tongan rugby union players
Tonga international rugby union players
Tongan expatriate rugby union players
Expatriate rugby union players in Scotland
Expatriate rugby union players in Japan
Expatriate rugby union players in France
Tongan expatriate sportspeople in Scotland
Tongan expatriate sportspeople in Japan
Tongan expatriate sportspeople in France
Blues (Super Rugby) players
North Harbour rugby union players
Mitsubishi Sagamihara DynaBoars players
Glasgow Warriors players
Oyonnax Rugby players
Rugby union number eights
People from Tongatapu